Mirpur 11 metro station (romanised: Mirpur egaro metro steshen) is a metro station of the Dhaka Metro's MRT Line 6. This station is located in Mirpur, a suburb of Dhaka. The station commenced operation from 15 March 2023.

Station

Station layout

References

Dhaka Metro stations
Railway stations opened in 2023
2023 establishments in Bangladesh